The 2012 IFSC Climbing World Cup was held in 17 locations. Bouldering competitions were held in 6 locations, lead in 9 locations, and speed in 6 locations. The season began on 13 April in Chongqing, China and concluded on 18 November in Kranj, Slovenia.

The top 3 in each competition received medals, and the overall winners were awarded trophies. At the end of the season an overall ranking was determined based upon points, which athletes were awarded for finishing in the top 30 of each individual event.

The winners for bouldering were Rustam Gelmanov and Anna Stöhr, for lead Sachi Amma and Mina Markovič, for speed Stanislav Kokorin and Alina Gaidamakina, and for combined Jakob Schubert and Mina Markovič, men and women respectively.

Highlights of the season 
In bouldering, at the World Cup in Munich, Akiyo Noguchi of Japan flashed all boulders in the final round to take the win.

In speed climbing, at the World Cup in Xining, Evgenii Vaitcekhovskii of Russia set a new world record of 5.88 seconds in the semifinal against his teammate Sergey Abdrakhmanov's 5.98 seconds. 
At the end of the season, Russian athletes, Stanislav Kokorin and Alina Gaidamakina clinched the overall titles of the season for men and women respectively, making it double speed titles for Russia.

Overview

References

External links 

IFSC Climbing World Cup
2012 in sport climbing